Elections to North Dorset District Council were held on 6 May 1999, alongside other local elections across the United Kingdom. The Liberal Democrats lost the council to no overall control.

Results

References 

1999 English local elections
North Dorset District Council elections
20th century in Dorset